The U-17 UNIFFAC Cup is an association football competition contested by the under-17 national teams of Football Associations associated with the  Central African Football Federations' Union (UNIFFAC).

Results

External links
CafOnline.com

 
International association football competitions in Africa
 
UNIFFAC competitions